Centaurea ragusina is a species of Centaurea found in Croatia.

References

External links

ragusina
Endemic flora of Croatia